Hesperus (or Hesperos) was a Greek mythological figure.

Hesperus may also refer to:

People
Hesperos or Wesparos, a name for the Western Locrians

Places in the United States
Hesperus, Colorado, an unincorporated community in Colorado
Hesperus Mountain (Colorado), a mountain in the San Juan Mountains of Colorado
Hesperus Ski Area, a ski area near Hesperus, Colorado
Mount Hesperus (Alaska), a mountain in the Revelation Mountains of Alaska

Arts, entertainment, and media
Hesperus (ensemble), an early-music ensemble
Hesperos, a periodical newspaper, issued in Leipzig, in the late 19th cenrury, in Greek
Hesperus Press Ltd., a British independent publisher
Hesperus oder 45 Hundposttage, a 1795 novel by the German Romantic writer Jean Paul

Ships
Hesperus (clipper ship), traded between England and Adelaide, South Australia 
HMS Hesperus (H57), a destroyer in the Royal Navy

See also
Esperos, a modern Greek football club
Hesperides
Hesperis 
Hesperium
Hesperius
Wreck of the Hesperus (band)
"Wreck of the Hesperus" (song)
"Wreck of the Hesperus", a poem by Henry Wadsworth Longfellow